Andrewsianthus ferrugineus is a species of liverworts in the family Lophoziaceae. It is found in Bhutan and Nepal. It grows on tree trunks in forests. It is threatened by deforestation. According to the IUCN Red List of Threatened Species, its status is endangered.

References

Jungermanniales
Endangered plants
Flora of Nepal
Flora of Bhutan
Taxonomy articles created by Polbot